SS Santhia was a  steam cargo liner built for the British-India Steam Navigation Company in 1901 by William Denny & Brothers, Dumbarton. She was sold to Japan in 1923 and was in service until 1935, when she was scrapped.

Description
The ship was powered by a triple expansion steam engine of 2,387ihp and made by Denny & Co, Dumbarton.

She had accommodation for 9 first class, 16 second class and 1,377 steerage class passengers or 2,204 deck passengers and was operated by a crew of 24 officers and 70 ratings.

History
Santhia was built as yard number 648 by William Denny & Brothers, Dumbarton, Renfrewshire for the British-India Steam Navigation Company at a cost of £91,000. She was launched on 30 September 1901, and was completed that November. She was the first of three vessels of that name to serve with the company. Santhia made her maiden voyage on 13 December 1901. She sailed from London to Colombo, Ceylon and Madras & Calcutta in India.

She was used for the transportation of Indian indentured labourers to the colonies. Details of some of these voyages are as follows:

Between August 1917 and February 1919 Santhia was requisitioned by the British Government.

In 1923, Santhia was sold to Saka Kisen K.K., Japan and renamed Saka Maru. Her port of registry was Dairen and the Code Letters QBST were allocated. She was scrapped in 1935 in Japan.

See also 
 Indian Indenture Ships to Fiji
 Indian indenture system

References

Further reading

External links 
 Photograph of Santhia

Ships of the British India Steam Navigation Company
Indian indenture ships to Fiji
Passenger ships of the United Kingdom
Ships built on the River Clyde
1901 ships
Steamships of the United Kingdom
Passenger ships of Japan
Steamships of Japan
World War I merchant ships of the United Kingdom
Merchant ships of Japan
Cargo liners